Radiant is the third studio album by American rhythm and blues band Atlantic Starr.

Overview
The album was produced by veteran Motown producer James Anthony Carmichael, best known for his work with The Jackson 5 and Commodores.

The tracks "When Love Calls", "Send for Me", and "Am I Dreaming" were released as singles.

Track listing

Personnel
 Sharon Bryant – lead vocals (1, 6, 8), backing vocals 
 Wayne Lewis – keyboards, backing vocals, lead vocals (3, 4, 7)
 David Lewis – guitars, backing vocals, lead vocals (2, 6)
 Clifford Archer – bass
 Porter Carroll, Jr. – drums, backing vocals, lead vocals (5)
 Joseph Phillips – percussion
 Koran Daniels – saxophones
 Jonathan Lewis – trombone
 William Suddeth III – trumpet

Arrangements 
 James Anthony Carmichael (1-8)
 David Lewis (1, 2, 3, 5)
 Wayne Lewis (1, 2, 3, 5)
 Atlantic Starr (4, 6, 7, 8)

Production
 James Anthony Carmichael – producer
 Calvin Harris – engineer
 Bernie Grundman – mastering at A&M Studios (Hollywood, California).
 Chuck Beeson – art direction 
 Lynn Robb – design 
 Ted Witus – design, logo, lettering
 George DuBose – photography

Charts

Weekly charts

Year-end charts

Singles

References

Atlantic Starr albums
1981 albums
A&M Records albums
Albums produced by James Anthony Carmichael